Tibiosioma is a genus of longhorn beetles of the subfamily Lamiinae, containing the following species:

 Tibiosioma flavolineata Giorgi, 2001
 Tibiosioma maculosa Martins & Galileo, 2007
 Tibiosioma remipes Martins & Galileo, 1990

References

Onciderini